Richard W. Bray, known as Richie Bray, was an Aboriginal Australian rules footballer who played for the Port Adelaide Football Club.

As a child, Bray was a resident of St Francis House, a home for inland Aboriginal Australian boys from 1946 to 1959 in the Adelaide suburb of Semaphore South.

Bray played a single game for Port Adelaide F.C. in 1959, then moved to Alice Springs for a few years.

In 1962 Bray played in his first premiership for the club, and also played in the 1963 and 1965 premiership sides under coach Fos Williams. Over the eight years he spent at the club, he played 77 games. He mostly played half forward flank, and kicked 65 goals, but in the 1962 Grand Final (when Port Adelaide won the Grand Final against West Adelaide), he played on the wing.

He also coached locally at the Semaphore Football Club.

He died in November 2017.

References

Australian rules footballers from South Australia
Indigenous Australian players of Australian rules football
Port Adelaide Football Club (SANFL) players
Port Adelaide Football Club players (all competitions)
Year of birth missing